Flå is a municipality in Viken county, Norway.  The administrative centre of the municipality is the village of Flå.  The municipality of Flå was established when it was separated from the municipality of Nes on 1 January 1905.  The municipality lies at the most southeasterly point in the valley and traditional region of Hallingdal.

General information

Name
The Old Norse form of the name was Flóða sokn (sokn means parish). This is the plural genitive case of flœð meaning "flood" (probably because flooding has been a problem for many farms in the river valley).  Prior to 1921, the name was written "Flaa".

Coat-of-arms
The coat-of-arms is from modern times.  They were granted on 1 March 1985.  The arms show a black bear on a gray/silver background.  This was chosen because there used to be many bears in the Vassfaret area.  Prior to 1985, the municipality used a logo with a bear walking through the area.

History
Ancient routes went to Vestlandet through Valdres and Hallingdal and down Røldal to Odda. Reflecting this route, Hallingdal and its neighboring valley of Valdres in Oppland to the north were originally populated by migrants from Vestlandet and spoke a western dialect. In recognition of this, Cardinal Nicholas Breakespear, who was in Scandinavia as papal legate in 1153, included Hallingdal in the diocese of Stavanger.

Geography
Flå  is the southernmost municipality within Hallingdal and forms the gateway to Hallingdal from the south. Flå is bordered in the north by Sør-Aurdal, in the east by Ringerike, in the south by Krødsherad and Sigdal, in the west by Nore og Uvdal, and in the northwest by Nes. Travelers from the south pass through the 65 m long tunnel Hallingporten  on Norwegian National Road 7 (Riksvei 7) just located north of Gulsvik.

Vassfaret is a forested mountain valley bordering Flå. The Norefjell mountain range also includes parts of Flå as well as Nes, Ringerike and Sør-Aurdal municipalities.   Lake Krøderen  (Krøderfjord) stretches about 41 km north from the village of Krøderen and reaches to Gulsvik. The Hallingdalselva river flows into the lake from the north. The area includes the Vassfaret and Vidalen Conservation area which includes  Festningen Nature Reserve and Bukollen Nature Reserve as well as the Inner Vassfaret Conservation area which includes Bringen Nature Reserve.
.

Notable people 
 Kolbjørn Buøen (1895–1975) a Norwegian actor 
 Fredrik Gulsvik (born 1989) a Norwegian former footballer with over 100 club caps

Attractions 
Bjørneparken is located on Vikberget in Flå. The park is a sanctuary featuring various animals including bears, elk, deer, wolf, and lynx.

Protected areas
 Bringen Nature Reserve, established 28 June 1985
 Bukollen Nature Reserve, established 28 June 1985
 Festningen Nature Reserve, established 28 June 1985
 Flenten Nature Reserve, established 24 September 1993
 Stavnselva Nature Reserve, established 13 December 2002

See also
Protected areas of Norway

Gallery

References

External links

Municipal fact sheet from Statistics Norway

Culture in Flå on the map from Kulturnett.no

 
Hallingdal
Municipalities of Buskerud
Municipalities of Viken (county)